Shanmuganathan may refer to

 Shanmuganathan Ravishankar, LTTE Head of Intelligence
 Kuhan Shanmuganathan, Malaysian field hockey player
 S. Shanmuganathan (Sri Lankan politician)
 V. Shanmuganathan, Governor of Meghalaya
 S. P. Shanmuganathan, Indian politician
 S. Shanmuganathan, Indian politician
 Shanmuganathan Dillidurai, Indian murder victim in Singapore

See also
 Karampon Shanmuganathan Maha Vidyalayam, School in  Karampon, Sri Lanka.

Tamil masculine given names